Willard Lawrence Mueller Jr. (born August 30, 1956) is an American baseball coach and former Major League Baseball (MLB) pitcher. He spent his entire playing career with the Milwaukee Brewers organization (1978–1983), although in 1981, he was briefly loaned to the Denver Bears of the American Association, who were an affiliate of the Montreal Expos at the time.

Early years
Mueller was born in West Bend, Wisconsin. Mueller attended West Bend West High School where he starred as a prep pitcher.

Baseball career
Mueller was an undrafted free agent signed after the June 1974 Major League Baseball Draft.  Mueller made his major league debut four years later, at twenty one years old against the Boston Red Sox.  Mueller's final appearance was September 20, 1981 against the Baltimore Orioles.

Post-playing career
After Mueller's baseball career, he played the role of the Duke, in the 1989 blockbuster Major League. Mueller's role as the Duke was as a menacing relief pitcher for the New York Yankees.

Mueller is currently the pitching coach at Concordia University Wisconsin.

Personal life
Mueller resides in his home town of West Bend, Wisconsin. He has two children, Lindsey and Daniel. His daughter Lindsey was a volleyball player at Division 1 Binghamton University. His son Daniel is currently a pitcher and shortstop for Concordia University Wisconsin. Mueller is also the uncle of former San Francisco Giants third baseman Ryan Rohlinger and Adam Rohlinger who was a division 3 All American baseball player at Concordia University Wisconsin. Another nephew, Mike Mueller, pitched professionally in the Atlanta Braves system.

Mueller remains quite close to former teammates, Jim Gantner, Robin Yount, and Jerry Augustine.

References

External links
Willard Mueller

1956 births
Living people
Baseball players from Wisconsin
Major League Baseball pitchers
Milwaukee Brewers players
People from West Bend, Wisconsin
Sportspeople from the Milwaukee metropolitan area
American expatriate baseball players in Canada
Burlington Bees players
Clinton Pilots players
Denver Bears players
Holyoke Millers players
Newark Co-Pilots players
Vancouver Canadians players
Wichita Aeros players